Chrysallida mayii, common name the May's pyramid-shell,  is a species of sea snail, a marine gastropod mollusk in the family Pyramidellidae, the pyrams and their allies.

Description
The length of the shell measures 2.5 mm.

Distribution

References

 OBIS : Odostomia mayii

External links
 Tasmanian shells: photo of Odostomoia mayii

mayii
Gastropods described in 1898